Abkhazians, or  Abkhazes, are a Northwest Caucasian ethnic group, mainly living in Abkhazia, a disputed region on the northeastern coast of the Black Sea. A large Abkhaz diaspora population resides in Turkey, the origins of which lie in the population movements from the Caucasus in the late 19th century. Many Abkhaz also live in other parts of the former Soviet Union, particularly in Russia and Ukraine.

Ethnology 

The Abkhaz language belongs to the isolate Northwest Caucasian language family, also known as Abkhaz–Adyghe or North Pontic family, which groups the dialectic continuum spoken by the Abaza–Abkhaz (Abazgi) and Adyghe ("Circassians" in English). Abkhazians are closely ethnically related to Circassians. Classical sources speak of several tribes dwelling in the region, but their exact identity and location remain controversial due to Abkhaz–Georgian historiographical conflict.

Subgroups
There are also three subgroups of the Abkhaz people. The Bzyb (Бзыԥ, Bzyph) reside in the Bzyb River region, and speak their own dialect. The Abzhui (Абжьыуа, Abzhwa) live in the Kodori River region, and also speak their own dialect, which the Abkhaz literary language is based upon. Finally, there are the Samurzakan who reside in the southeast of Abkhazia.

History
 
Some scholars deem the ancient Heniochi tribe the progenitors of the Abkhaz. This warlike people came into contact with Ancient Greeks through the colonies of Dioskourias and Pitiuntas. In the Roman period, the Abasgoi are mentioned as inhabiting the region. These Abasgoi (Abkhaz) were described by Procopius as warlike, worshippers of three deities, under the suzerainty of the Kingdom of Lazica. The Abkhazian view is that the Apsilae and Abasgoi are ancestors of the Abkhaz–Adyghe group of peoples, while the Georgian view is that those were Colchians (Kartvelians or Georgians).

Lazica was a vassal kingdom of the Byzantine Empire throughout most of its existence. Later the independent Kingdom of Abkhazia was established and the region became a part of the Georgian cultural world. The local nobility, clergy and educated class used Georgian as a language of literacy and culture. From the early 11th to the 15th century, Abkhazia was a part of the all-Georgian monarchy, but then became a separate Principality of Abkhazia only to be conquered by the Ottomans.

Towards the end of the 17th century, the region became a theatre of widespread slave trade and piracy. According to a controversial theory developed by Pavle Ingorokva in the 1950s, at that time a number of the Northwest Caucasian pagan Abaza tribes migrated from the north and blended with the local ethnic elements, significantly changing the region's demographic situation. These views were described as ethnocentric and having little historical support. They served as intellectual support to the Stalin-era assimilation policy and had a profound influence on the Georgian nationalism in the 1980s.

The Russian conquest of Abkhazia from the 1810s to the 1860s was accompanied by a massive expulsion of Muslim Abkhaz to the Ottoman Empire and the introduction of a strong Russification policy. As a result, the Abkhaz diaspora is currently estimated to measure at least twice the number of Abkhaz that reside in Abkhazia. The largest part of the diaspora now lives in Turkey, with estimates ranging from 100,000 to 500,000, with smaller groups in Syria (5,000 – 10,000) and Jordan. In recent years, some of these have emigrated to the West, principally to Germany (5,000), Netherlands, Switzerland, Belgium, France, United Kingdom, Austria and the United States (mainly to New Jersey).

After the Russian Revolution of 1917, Abkhazia was a part of the Democratic Republic of Georgia, but was conquered by the Red Army in 1921 and eventually entered the Soviet Union as a Soviet Socialist Republic associated with the Georgian SSR. The status of Abkhazia was downgraded in 1931 when it became an Autonomous SSR within the Georgian SSR. Under Joseph Stalin, a forcible collectivization was introduced and the native communist elite purged. The influx of Armenians, Russians and Georgians into the growing agricultural and tourism sectors was also encouraged, and Abkhaz schools were briefly closed. By 1989, the number of Abkhaz was about 93,000 (18% of the population of the autonomous republic), while the Georgian population numbered 240,000 (45%). The number of Armenians (15% of the entire population) and Russians (14%) grew substantially as well.

The 1992–1993 War in Abkhazia followed by the ethnic cleansing of Georgians in Abkhazia left the Abkhaz an ethnic plurality of ca. 45%, with Russians, Armenians, Georgians, Greeks, and Jews comprising most of the remainder of the population of Abkhazia. The 2003 census established the total number of Abkhaz in Abkhazia at 94,606. However, the exact demographic figures for the region are disputed and alternative figures are available. The de facto Abkhaz president Sergey Bagapsh suggested, in 2005, that less than 70,000 ethnic Abkhaz lived in Abkhazia.

At the time of the 2011 Census, 122,175 Abkhaz were living in Abkhazia. They were 50.8% of the total population of the republic.

In the course of the Syrian uprising, a number of Abkhaz living in Syria immigrated to Abkhazia. By mid-April 2013, approximately 200 Syrians of Abkhaz descent had arrived in Abkhazia. A further 150 were due to arrive by the end of April. The Abkhazian leadership has stated that it would continue the repatriation of Abkhaz living abroad. As of August 2013, 531 Abkhaz had arrived from Syria according to the Abkhazian government.

Economy
The typical economy is strong on the breeding of cattle, beekeeping, viticulture, and agriculture.

Religion

The Abkhaz people are principally divided into Abkhazian Orthodox Christian (the Abkhazian Orthodox Church is not recognized by any of the world Orthodox churches, but the territory is recognized as the Eparchy of Bichvinta and Tskhum-Abkhazia of the Georgian Orthodox Church) and Sunni Muslim (Hanafi) communities, (prevalent in Abkhazia and Turkey respectively) but the indigenous non-Abrahamic beliefs have always been strong. Although Christianity made its first appearance in the realm of their Circassian neighbours in the first century AD via the travels and preaching of the Saint Andrew, and became the dominant religion of Circassians in the 3rd to 4th centuries, Christianity became the dominant religion of Abkhazians in the 6th century during the reign of Byzantine emperor Justinian I, and continued to be followed under the kings of Georgia in the High Middle Ages. The Ottomans introduced Islam in the 16th century and the region became largely Muslim gradually until the 1860s.

Diaspora
Many Muslim Cherkess, Abkhaz and Chechens migrated to the Ottoman Empire following revolts against Russian rule. It is believed that the Abkhaz community in Turkey is larger than that of Abkhazia itself. Some 250 Abkhaz-Abaza villages are estimated throughout Turkey. According to Andrew Dalby, Abkhazian-speakers might number more than 100,000 in Turkey, however, the 1963 census only recorded 4,700 native speakers and 8,000 secondary speakers. Of the 15,000 ethnic Abkhaz in Turkey, only 4,000 speak the language, the rest having assimilated into Turkish society. As of 2006, it is estimated that 600,000 to 800,000 Abkhazians by descent live in Turkey.

Genetics
The ethnic group closest to Abkhazians in terms of genetic distance are Georgians, being nearly identical to Western Georgian genetics.

Gallery

Notable people

Literature 
 Fazil Iskander (1929–2016), writer
 Alexey Gogua, (born 1932), writer
 Bagrat Shinkuba (1917–2004), writer, poet
 Murat Yagan (1915–2013), author of ancient teachings

Politics 
 Sergei Bagapsh (1949–2011), President of Abkhazia
 Rauf Orbay (1881–1964), Turkish politician
 Hayreddin Pasha (1820–1890), Ottoman politician
 Nestor Lakoba (1893–1936), Abkhaz communist leader

See also
 Afro-Abkhazians
 Women in Abkhazia
 History of Abkhazia

References

Sources

 David Marshall Lang, Caucasian Studies, University of London, 1964, Vol.1
 Roger Rosen, Georgia: Sovereign Country of the Caucasus, Odyssey, 2004, 
 

 L. Bitadze, "Anthropological History of Abkhazians", Javakhishvili Institute of History and Ethnology, 2009

Abkhaz people
Indigenous peoples of Europe
Peoples of the Caucasus